TTD may refer to:

Places and organizations
 Tirumala Tirupati Devasthanams, an independent trust which manages the Sri Venkateswara Temple in Andhra Pradesh, India
 Portland-Troutdale Airport, IATA airport code
 The Trade Desk,  NASDAQ symbol

Entertainment
 Tic-Tac-Dough, a game show
 Transport Tycoon Deluxe, a computer game

Medicine
 Therapeutic Targets Database, a database to provide information about the known and explored therapeutic targets
 Trichothiodystrophy, a characteristic of Tay syndrome

Other
 Trinidad and Tobago dollar, ISO 4217 currency code
 Terence Trent D'Arby, former stage name of singer Sananda Maitreya
 Tombstone Tenzan Driver, the name of the finisher of Japanese pro wrestler, Hiroyoshi Tenzan
 True time delay, an electrical property of a transmitting apparatus
 Top Thrill Dragster, the second tallest and third fastest roller coaster in the world located at Cedar Point
 Total Terminal Difficulty, the total number of hashes on a blockchain before a specific protocol upgrade will occur